The olfactory mucosa is located in the upper region of the nasal cavity and is made up of the olfactory epithelium and the underlying lamina propria, connective tissue containing fibroblasts, blood vessels, Bowman's glands and bundles of fine axons from the olfactory neurons.

The mucus protects the olfactory epithelium and allows odors to dissolve so that they can be detected by olfactory receptor neurons. Electron microscopy studies show that Bowman's glands contain cells with large secretory vesicles. The exact composition of the secretions from Bowman's glands is unclear, but there is evidence that they produce odorant binding protein.

In vertebrates, the olfactory epithelium consists of a three basic cell types: bipolar olfactory receptor neurons; sustentacular cells, a type of supporting cell; and basal cells, the stem cells that continuously give rise to new olfactory receptor neurons and sustentacular cells.

Cells in the olfactory mucosa have been used in clinical trials for adult stem cell therapeutic treatments and successfully harvested for future applications.

Type 1 cannabinoid receptors (CB1 receptors) are present in the sustentacular cells of the olfactory mucosa, in the periglomerular cells of the olfactory bulb, and in the anterior olfactory nucleus and olfactory cortices. A study in 2008 in mice has shown, that the level of CB1 expression in various brain regions, including the olfactory nucleus, is modulated by diet-induced obesity.

See also 

 Cannabinoid receptors
 Endocannabinoid system

References

Olfactory system